Barney Clinton "El Grillo" Serrell (March 9, 1920 – August 15, 1996) was an American baseball second baseman in the Negro leagues and the Mexican League. He played from 1941 to 1957 with several teams. He is also listed as William C. Serrell and Bonnie Serrell.

Serrell started his Negro league career with the Chicago American Giants, playing one game and going 1-for-4. He then moved to the Kansas City Monarchs, where he played for four seasons. In 1942, he finished second in the batting title race of the Negro American League, batting .360, which was only beaten out by Ted Strong, his teammate (.364). He led the league in triples with five.  In the 1942 Negro World Series against the Homestead Grays, he batted .412 with five runs batted in in the series win. He batted .287 in 53 games in 1943 while leading the league in doubles and triples. In 1944, he made his one East-West All-Star Game while batting .355 in 28 games while leading in runs (twenty), home runs (two), and runs batted in (eighteen). In 1945, he played in three games and had just two hits before he was released.

In 2020, Serrell was inducted into the Mexican Professional Baseball Hall of Fame.

References

External links
 and Seamheads
NLBPA.com

1920 births
1996 deaths
African-American baseball players
Alijadores de Tampico players
American expatriate baseball players in Mexico
Baseball players from Louisiana
Kansas City Monarchs players
Mexican Baseball Hall of Fame inductees
Tecolotes de Nuevo Laredo players
20th-century African-American sportspeople
Baseball infielders